El Kharga Airport  is an airport serving the city of El Kharga, Egypt.

Airlines and destinations

See also
Transport in Egypt
List of airports in Egypt

References

External links
 OurAirports - Egypt
   Great Circle Mapper - El Kharga
 El Kharga Airport

Airports in Egypt